Tatjana is a 1923 German silent film directed by Robert Dinesen and starring Olga Tschechowa, Paul Hartmann and Leopold von Ledebur.

Cast
 Olga Tschechowa as Tatjana  
 Paul Hartmann as Fedja Gorykin  
 Robert Dinesen as Fürst Boris Orloff  
 Leopold von Ledebur as Graf Schuwaloff  
 Maria Peterson as Ulidtka, Fedjas Mutter 
 Albert Patry 
 Karl Platen 
 Paul Rehkopf 
 Charolia Strakosch 
 Max Wogritsch

References

Bibliography
 Hans-Michael Bock and Tim Bergfelder. The Concise Cinegraph: An Encyclopedia of German Cinema. Berghahn Books.

External links
 

1923 films
German silent feature films
Films of the Weimar Republic
Films directed by Robert Dinesen
UFA GmbH films
Films produced by Erich Pommer
German black-and-white films
Films set in Russia